Igbo Jews are members of the Igbo people of Nigeria who practice Judaism. Jewish life has been documented in parts of Nigeria since the precolonial period, but it is not known for the Igbo to have claimed Israelite descent or practiced Judaism in precolonial times. During and after the Biafran war (1967-1970), more widespread Igbo identification with Jews concretized.

Historical scrutiny
An early and widely influential statement from Olaudah Equiano, a Christian-educated Igbo man and freed slave, suggested a Jewish migratory origin for the Igbo. He speculated in his autobiography of 1789 on the  strong analogy which ... appears to prevail in the manners and customs of my countrymen and those of the Jews, before they reached the Land of Promise, and particularly the patriarchs while they were yet in that pastoral state which is described in Genesis—an analogy, which alone would induce me to think that the one people had sprung from the other.

Historians, archaeologists, historical linguists, and those from other scientifically based disciplines have argued against these claims. Though there is no doubt that Jews were present in Saharan trade centers during the first millennium AD, there is no evidence that the Igbo people had any contemporaneous contact with historical Jewish populations, or that they had at any point adopted Judaism prior to colonization by the European powers.

Critical historians have reviewed the historical literature on West Africa which was published during the nineteenth and early twentieth centuries. They have clarified the diverse functions (quite aside from questions of validity) which such histories served for the writers who proposed them at various times in the colonial and post-colonial past.

Contemporary outreach
Certain Nigerian communities with Judaic practices have received help from individual Israelis and American Jews who work in Nigeria, outreach organizations like the American Kulanu, and African-American Jewish communities in America. 

Because no formal census has been taken in the region, the number of Igbo in Nigeria who identify as Jews is not known, but they currently have at least 26 synagogues of various sizes. In 2008 an estimated 30,000 Igbos were practicing some form of Judaism, though others have cited a more conservative figure of 2,000 to 3,000 Igbo practicing Judaism.

Rabbi Howard Gorin visited the community in 2006 and members of his synagogue, "Tikvat Israel" in Rockville, Maryland, USA, supported those in Nigeria by sending books, computers, and religious articles.

In addition to Rabbi Howard Gorin, visitors have included Dr. Daniel Lis, Professor William F. S. Miles, filmmaker Jeff L. Lieberman, and the American writer Shai Afsai.

In 2013 Shai Afsai invited two of the Igbo Jewish leaders, Elder Azuka (Pinchas) Ogbukaa and Elder Ovadiah Agbai, to Rhode Island in the United States. Following their stay, Afsai wrote: "Their 12-day visit has helped solidify a budding relationship between the Rhode Island and Abuja communities. Now that we know each other a little better, we may consider what further joys and responsibilities this relationship entails." The Rhode Island visit of the Igbo Jewish Elders led Rabbi Barry Dolinger of Rhode Island to go to Nigeria with Afsai in 2014.

A main concern of Igbo Jews remains how to be part of the wider Jewish world, according to a spokesman of Abuja's Gihon Hebrews Synagogue, Prince Azuka Ogbukaa.

Religious practices
The religious practices of the Igbo Jews include circumcision eight days after the birth of a male child, the observance of kosher dietary laws, the separation of men and women during menstruation, the wearing of the tallit and kippah, and the celebration of holidays such as Yom Kippur and Rosh Hashanah. In recent times, the communities have also adopted the celebration of holidays such as Hanukkah and Purim.

Igbo Jews in Israel 
Over the past few decades, several Igbo have emigrated to Israel, particularly to Tel Aviv. This wave of immigration can partially be explained by a small diaspora which was established in Israel when Nigeria was granted independence in 1960. This is partially due to comprehensive educational programs which the Israelis implemented in the new Nigerian state after the 1960s, programs which familiarized many people with the idea of Israel as a modern nation state for the first time, and the possible opportunities which existed for Jewish people who lived there.

The Igbo Jewish community is not recognized as a Jewish community for the purpose of immigration to Israel by Israel's Supreme Court. Additionally, none of the mainstream denominations of Judaism consider the group an authentically Jewish community. Indeed, while they identify themselves as being a part of the worldwide Jewish community, they are still struggling to be recognized as Jews by other Jews. An affiliate of Gihon Hebrews' Synagogue expressed this struggle to Shai Afsai in Abuja: "We say we are Jews from blood. We are now excluded; we cannot go and participate as Jews in any place. I make an appeal that we be recognized, not excluded and isolated from other Jews."

However, some Igbo Jews are currently adopting more rigorous religious customs, in order to gain more acceptance from the mainstream Jewish community. For instance, Daniel Lis explained in his article that parts of the Igbo Jewish community are assimilating themselves to the standards of Orthodox Judaism, so as to be universally accepted as Jews in Israel.

While Igbo Jews claim that they are the descendants of the ancient Israelites, others say they lack the historical evidence which would prove their descent from such a community, and they also lack evidence of a continuous practice of Judaism which should predate colonial contact. Regardless of the historicity of their claims, the Igbo Jews can simply be recognized as modern Jews, either by the State of Israel as a whole, or by any of the major streams of the Jewish religion, which would confer automatic recognition of them by the State of Israel. Frustrating the possibility that the state might make such a determination, and frustrating the possibility that a Jewish denomination might recognize the entire community as an authentically Jewish one is the fact that some Igbo Jews simultaneously claim to be Christians, calling their commitment to Judaism and their claim to have a Jewish identity into question. Among them are a number of Igbo who have illegally emigrated to Israel by simultaneously claiming to be Jews and Christians. According to the official administration of Israel, a number of Igbo were granted the right to travel in Israel for the purposes of Christian pilgrimage, but they have overstayed their visas, and now they are illegally living and working in the country.

The State of Israel has made no official recommendations as to whether the Igbo Jews constitute a legally recognizable Jewish community for the purposes of immigration to Israel, nor is their legal status currently being debated at any level within the state. However, several Igbo Jews who have undergone formal conversions to Orthodox or Conservative Judaism have been accepted as Jews on an individual basis under the Law of Return, and they have also immigrated to Israel.

See also
 Christianity and Judaism
 Groups claiming affiliation with Israelites
 History of the Jews in Africa
 Judaizers
 Abayudaya (Uganda)
 Beta Israel (Ethiopia)
 House of Israel (Ghana)
 Kingdom of Loango #Judaism in Loango
 Jews of Bilad el-Sudan
 Lemba people

References

External links
Hebrew Karaite Community Igbo Bene Israel
Re-Emerging: The Jews of Nigeria
Kulanu
Packing for Nigeria

Groups claiming Jewish descent
Igbo Jews
Jewish Nigerian history
Nigerian Jews